GFX may refer to:

 Shorthand for Graphics
 Fujifilm GFX series, a line of medium-format digital cameras
 Scaleform GFx, a game development middleware package